Lenore is a feminine given name which may refer to:

Lenore Aubert (1913–1993), American actress 
Lenore E. Bixby (1914–1994), American statistician
Lenore Blum (born 1942), American mathematician and professor of computer science
Lenore Chinn (born 1949), American artist
Lenore Coffee (1896–1984), American writer
Lenore Kandel (1932–2009), American poet
Lenore Kight (1911–2000), American swimmer
Lenore RS Lim (born 1945), Filipino artist 
Lenore Manderson (born 1951), Australian medical anthropologist
Lenore Marshall (1899–1971), American poet, novelist and activist
Lenore Muraoka (born 1955), American golfer
Lenore Carrero Nesbitt (1932–2001), American judge
Lenore Raphael (born 1942), American jazz pianist and educator
Lenore Romney (1908–1998), wife of American businessman and politician George W. Romney and mother of politician Mitt Romney
Lenore Skenazy (1907–2007), American newspaper columnist
Lenore Smith (born 1958), Australian actress
Lenore Tawney (1907–2007), American artist
Lenore Ulric (1892–1970), American actor
Lenore Zann (born 1959), Canadian politician and actress

English-language feminine given names